Wolfgang Wessel (born 30 January 1960) is the consul of Germany to Turkey in Antalya.

References 

1960 births
Living people
People from Neustadt an der Weinstraße